For the former airline, see Hamburg Airlines

Hamburg Airways (legally HHA Hamburg Airways Luftverkehrsgesellschaft mbH) was a small German charter airline which operated between 2010 and 2014. It was based in Hamburg and offered holiday flights on behalf of tour operators. The airline operated flights out of several German airports, with its maintenance base being located at Hamburg Airport. Flights were operated throughout Europe, Eurasia, the Middle East and Africa.

History
The airline was founded in December 2010 following the demise of Hamburg International in late 2010, which had left a void on the German holiday flight market. The first revenue flights for Hamburg Airways were conducted in March 2011. During the 2011 summer season an Airbus A319 was additionally operated on behalf of Condor.

In December 2014 the airline had its Air Operator Certificate suspended by the German aviation authorities and ceased flying. Aircraft have been returned to lessors, but the airline said it hoped to resume in 2015. The last available financial figures show losses of 10,8 million Euros in 2012. The airlines' three aircraft have been transferred to and stored at Düsseldorf Airport. As of May 2015, all three former Hamburg Airways aircraft are sitting at the PEMCO hangar located at Tampa International Airport in Tampa, Florida, USA to be overhauled and put into service for Allegiant Airlines.

Destinations
Hamburg Airways served the following destinations :

Africa

Hurghada - Hurghada International Airport
Marsa Alam - Marsa Alam International Airport

Djerba - Djerba–Zarzis International Airport

Asia

Adana - Adana Şakirpaşa Airport
Ankara - Esenboğa International Airport
Antalya - Antalya Airport
Elazığ - Elazığ Airport
Gaziantep - Oğuzeli Airport
Hatay - Hatay Airport
Kayseri - Erkilet International Airport
Malatya - Malatya Erhaç Airport
Samsun - Samsun-Çarşamba Airport
Trabzon - Trabzon Airport

Europe

Bremen - Bremen Airport
Dortmund - Dortmund Airport
Düsseldorf - Düsseldorf Airport Base
Erfurt - Erfurt-Weimar Airport
Friedrichshafen - Friedrichshafen Airport
Hamburg - Hamburg Airport Base
Hanover - Hannover Airport Base
Karlsruhe/Baden-Baden - Baden Airpark
Münster/Osnabrück - Münster/Osnabrück Airport
Saarbrücken - Saarbrücken Airport
Stuttgart - Stuttgart Airport
Zweibrücken - Zweibrücken Airport

Heraklion - Heraklion Airport
Rhodes - Rhodes Airport

Pristina - Pristina International Airport Adem Jashari

Fuerteventura - Fuerteventura Airport
Gran Canaria - Gran Canaria Airport
Palma de Mallorca - Palma de Mallorca Airport
Tenerife - Tenerife South Airport

Fleet

As of October 2014, the Hamburg Airways fleet consisted of the following aircraft:

References

External links

 Official website

Defunct airlines of Germany
Airlines established in 2011
Airlines disestablished in 2014
Companies based in Hamburg
German companies established in 2011
German companies disestablished in 2014